WV-HEDW, in the long form Wilhelmina Vooruit Hortus Eendracht Doet Winnen,  is a football club in Amsterdam, Netherlands. The club plays at Sportpark Middenmeer and has the most adult members and teams among Dutch football clubs.

History 
The predecessors of the club, Wilhelmina Vooruit and HEDW, were badly hit in The Holocaust, when 236 of their Jewish members were murdered.

Since 1996, the Saturday first squad hovers between Derde and Eerste Klasse. WV-HEDW was promoted in 2018 in the Eerste Klasse, through playoffs. In 2022 it was promoted to the Vierde Divisie, after an Eerste Klasse championship.

The Sunday first squad won a Vijfde Klasse championship in 2019 and played in the Vierde Klasse after.

Notable players 
 Jan van Diepenbeek
 Ibrahim El Kadiri
 Mark Sifneos

References 

Football clubs in Amsterdam
Football clubs in the Netherlands
Association football clubs established in 1908
1908 establishments in the Netherlands